Carl David Engström (born 7 August 1990) is a Swedish footballer who plays for Västerås SK in Superettan as a defender.

References

External links 
 

Swedish footballers
Allsvenskan players
Superettan players
1990 births
Living people
Västerås SK Fotboll players
Västerås IK Fotboll players
Moheda IF players
IFK Värnamo players
BK Häcken players
Örgryte IS players
Association football defenders
Sportspeople from Västerås